Kennedy Town & Mount Davis is one of the 15 constituencies in the Central and Western District of Hong Kong.

The constituency returns one district councillor to the Central and Western District Council, with an election every four years. The seat was held by Chan Hok-fung of the DAB, until in 2019 he was defeated by Cherry Wong Kin-ching.

Kennedy Town & Mount Davis constituency is loosely based on the Kennedy Town including Sai Wan Estate, Mount Davis and deserted islands Green Island and Little Green Island with estimated population of 15,734.

Councillors represented

Election results

2010s

2000s

1990s

1980s

Notes

Citations

References
2011 District Council Election Results (Central & Western)
2007 District Council Election Results (Central & Western)
2003 District Council Election Results (Central & Western)
1999 District Council Election Results (Central & Western)

Constituencies of Hong Kong
Constituencies of Central and Western District Council
1982 establishments in Hong Kong
1994 establishments in Hong Kong
1985 disestablishments in Hong Kong
Kennedy Town
Mount Davis, Hong Kong
Constituencies established in 1982
Constituencies established in 1994
Constituencies disestablished in 1985